The 2011 Martyr's Memorial A-Division League (known as the Martyrs' Memorial Red Bull 'A' Division League Football Tournament 2011 for sponsorship reasons) was the 39th season of the A-Division League since its establishment in 1954/55. A total of 18 teams competed in the league. The season began on 28 April 2011 and concluded on 16 July 2011.

Defending champions Nepal Police Club won the league.

A record of 18 teams participated in the league, playing a total of 153 matches. The timing also had to be reduced to final constraints and the timing of world cup qualifiers. The major was due the inception of National League as the top-tier league of country. Therefore, the league returned to single leg round robin formation.

Teams
In the 2008-2009 season, two parallel B Division leagues were organized, one by the All Nepal Football Association, won by Swoyambhu Youth Club and one by the Nepal Football Association (NFA) won by Saraswoti Youth Club. After reconciliation, the four top teams from both leagues were promoted to 2011 Martyr's Memorial A-Division League. Prior to the season, Tribhuvan Army Club changed their name back to Nepal Army Club. Being based in Nawalparasi, Koilapani was the first ever team from outside the Kathmandu Valley to be promoted to the A-Division League.

Personnel and kits

Venues
The league was played centrally in two venues in Kathmandu.

League table

References

External links
Soccerway.com

Martyr's Memorial A-Division League seasons
1
Nepal